Sagamore is an unincorporated community in Armstrong County, Pennsylvania, United States. Its ZIP code is 16250.

Notable person

Dorothy Kovalchick (1925-2020), baseball player, was born in Sagamore.

Notes

Unincorporated communities in Armstrong County, Pennsylvania
Unincorporated communities in Pennsylvania